The Zhangye National Geopark is located in Sunan and Linze counties within the prefecture-level city of Zhangye, in Gansu, China. The site became a quasi-national geopark on April 23, 2012 (provisional name: Zhangye Danxia Geopark). It was formally designated as "Zhangye National Geopark" by the Ministry of Land and Resources on June 16, 2016 after it has passed the on-site acceptance test.

Known for its colorful rock formations, it has been voted by Chinese media outlets as one of the most beautiful landforms in China. It is not a UNESCO world heritage site.

Location

The park is located in the northern foothills of the Qilian Mountains, in the counties of Linze and Sunan, which are under the administration of the prefecture-level city of Zhangye, Gansu province. The main areas of Danxia landform are in Kangle and Baiyin townships.

It is the most developed and most visited part of the park. A second scenic area, Binggou, located on the north bank of Liyuan River, was officially inaugurated on 3 August 2014. A third area, Sunan Danxia Scenic Area, is located in Ganjun, south of Linze.

Landscape

Zhangye Danxia is known for the unusual colors of the rocks, which are smooth, sharp and several hundred meters tall. They are the result of deposits of sandstone and other minerals that occurred over 24 million years. The result (similar to a layer cake), was tilted by the action of the same tectonic plates responsible for creating parts of the Himalayan mountains. Wind, rain, and time then sculpted extraordinary shapes, including towers, pillars, and ravines, with varying colours, patterns, and sizes.

Media and tourism
In 2005, Zhangye Danxia was voted by a panel of reporters from 34 major media outlets as one of the most beautiful Danxia landform areas in China. In 2009, Chinese National Geography magazine chose Zhangye Danxia as one of the "six most beautiful landforms" in China. The area has become a top tourist attraction for Zhangye. A series of boardwalks and access roads have been built to help visitors to explore the rock formations. In 2014, 100 million yuan was invested to improve the facilities in the Binggou area.

Zhangye Danxia is featured as a natural wonder in the video game Sid Meier's Civilization VI. It was added in the "Rise and Fall" expansion.

Gallery

See also
China Danxia World Heritage Site
Candy Cane Mountains
Painted Hills
Seven Coloured Earths
Vinicunca

References

Notes

Bibliography

External links

Zhangye Danxia Geopark on TripAdvisor

Geoparks in China
Parks in Gansu
Zhangye
Danxia landform